The African Volleyball Confederation (French: Confédération Africaine de Volleyball, or CAVB) is the continental governing body for the sports of volleyball in Africa. Its headquarters are located in Rabat, Morocco.

Profile 
The CAVB was the last confederation to be created: it was established in 1972, when the FIVB turned its five Volleyball Zone Commissions into continental confederations. The African Volleyball Commission had been founded in 1967.

Although the national federation of Egypt was involved in the founding of the FIVB in 1947, the sport of volleyball remains essentially amateur in Africa, even in countries which maintain consistent Olympic programmes, such as South Africa or Kenya. There has been considerable effort by the international federation to increase competitivity in the continent through special development actions. The results of these measures are, still timid.

The CAVB's headquarters are located in Rabat, Morocco.

The CAVB is responsible for national volleyball federations located in Africa and organizes continental competitions such as the African Volleyball Championship (first edition, 1967). It also takes part in the organization of qualification tournaments for major events such as the Olympic Games or the men's and women's world championships, and of international competitions hosted by one of its affiliated federations.

Teams 
, no African team has ever been able to obtain impressive results in international competitions, neither in women's nor in men's events. It could be argued that Egypt has some tradition in the sport, since it is the oldest of all the national federations affiliated to the CAVB.

Judging from participation in international events, which is usually granted through continental qualification procedures, one may attribute predominance on the continent to the teams of Egypt and Tunisia in men's volleyball and Kenya, Egypt, and Tunisia in women's volleyball.

CAVB zones

Affiliated federations 
As of 2020, the following 54 national federations were affiliated to the CAVB that was divided into 5 subregions and 7 zones.

FIVB World Rankings

Tournaments

National team competitions

Men's competitions 
 Men's African Volleyball Championship 
 Men's African Volleyball Championship U23
 Men's African Volleyball Championship U21
 Men's African Volleyball Championship U19

Women's competitions 
 Women's African Volleyball Championship
 Women's African Volleyball Championship U23
 Women's Africa Volleyball Championship U20
 Girls' Africa Volleyball Championship U18

Club competitions
 African Clubs Championship
 African Volleyball Cup Winners' Cup
 Women's African Clubs Championship
 Women's African Cup Winners' Cup (volleyball)

Beach volleyball competitions
 Africa Beach Volleyball Championship
 Africa Women's Beach Volleyball Championship

Zonal competitions
 African Zone 1 Volleyball Championship
 African Zone 2 Volleyball Championship
 African Zone 3 Volleyball Championship
 African Zone 4 Volleyball Championship
 African Zone 5 Volleyball Championship
 African Zone 6 Volleyball Championship
 African Zone 7 Volleyball Championship

References

External links
NCAA list of African volleyball federations
National Volleyball Federation of the Central African Republic
National Volleyball Federation of Morocco

Volleyball organizations
Sports governing bodies in Africa